NGC 7038 is an intermediate spiral galaxy located about 210 million light-years away in the constellation of Indus. NGC 7038 was discovered by astronomer John Herschel on September 30, 1834.

On June 8, 2010 a type II supernova designated as SN 2010dx was discovered in NGC 7038.

NGC 7038 along with NGC 7014 are the brightest members of Abell 3742. Abell 3742 is located near the center of the Pavo–Indus Supercluster.

See also 
NGC 4725
NGC 7001
List of NGC objects (7001–7840)

References

External links 

 

Intermediate spiral galaxies
Indus (constellation)
7038
66414
Astronomical objects discovered in 1834
Abell 3742